Wellsville, Colorado is a small unincorporated community in western Fremont County, Colorado, United States. The town straddles the banks of the Arkansas River and follows the U.S. Route 50 before the road starts winding through tight curves into Chaffee County. Wellsville is the site of US Soil's processing facility, where it mines a natural fertilizer from an ancient lake bed.

See also

References

External links

 ColoradoGuy.com - Wellsville, Colorado Photos

Unincorporated communities in Fremont County, Colorado
Unincorporated communities in Colorado
Colorado populated places on the Arkansas River